John Barrett (born 11 August 1962) is the head coach for the Toronto Varsity Blues' men's volleyball team and is a former Canadian volleyball player. He played CIAU men's volleyball for the Calgary Dinosaurs before transferring to play for the Manitoba Bisons with whom he won a national championship while being named the tournament's most valuable player. He competed in the men's tournament at the 1984 Summer Olympics where the Canadian team finished in fourth place.

Barrett joined the Toronto Varsity Blues in 2006 as an assistant coach where he spent five years in that role. He was named the program's head coach on 19 September 2011.

References

External links
Toronto Varsity Blues profile

1962 births
Living people
Canadian men's volleyball players
Olympic volleyball players of Canada
Volleyball players at the 1984 Summer Olympics
Volleyball players from Toronto
Calgary Dinos volleyball players
Manitoba Bisons volleyball players